The A85 is a Class 8 combine harvester made by Gleaner Manufacturing Company a division of AGCO. The A85 is the largest Gleaner made, boasting a 459 horsepower Caterpillar C13 engine. It has a 350 bushel bin capacity, which it can unload in less than 90 seconds; unloading 4.5 bushels per second. 

The A85 has a 4-speed hydrostatic rotor drive train. The engine is a 763 cubic inch inline 6-cylinder turbocharged diesel. Production of the A85 has been from 2006 to 2008.

See also

Gleaner Manufacturing Company

AGCO

Gleaner E

References

Combine harvesters